Pustakanch Gaav (English: Village of Books) is a special library in Bhilar, Maharashtra that opened on May 4, 2017. The initiative was conceptualized and led by Vinod Tawde, Minister of Cultural Affairs and Marathi Language and inaugurated by Devendra Fadnavis, Ex.Chief Minister of Maharashtra. This government initiative is inspired by Britain’s Hay-on-Wye, a notable Welsh town known for its book stores. At the time of launch, there were 25 artistically decorated locations in Bhilar that are turned into spots for readers; collectively they housed over 15,000 books in 18 distinct genres. Most books were in Marathi language and there were plans to add additional 25,000 books in other languages such as English, Hindi and Gujarati.

On 2021 June 19, Perumkulam, a village in Kerala’sKollam district, was declared a Pusthaka Gramam (village of books) by Kerala Chief Minister Pinarayi Vijayan. The announcement made on June 19, National Reading Day, makes it Kerala’s first such village. At the heart of the announcement is its library, Bapuji Smaraka Vayanasala.

History

Planning 
Bhilar, a village near Mahabaleshwar and [Panchgani], was finalized as the location; the long-term vision is to promote the destination as a cultural and literary hub. Seventy five artists from across India traveled to Bhilar to creatively design 25 locations that were shortlisted as reading spots and exhibition centers. These locations include a temple, two schools, several houses and homestays.

Events 
Recitations and depictions of classic work of many renowned poets and writers are organized by community in past. Event is often grazed by dignitaries in literature field.

Dosti Pustakanshi 
A special program on the occasion of Vaachan Prerna Din’, honoring the life and legacy of our former President A. P. J. Abdul Kalam on his birth anniversary. Event was covered by leading Marathi news channel ABP Mazha.

Smaran Vindanche 
Rajya Marathi Vikas Sanstha organized a grand commemorating in the legacy of poet Vinda Karandikar . The day was spent with beautiful recitation, poetry reading and moving monologues, with the participation of eminent dignitaries like Dr. Aruna Dhere, Jayashree Kale, Pradeep Niphadkar, Dr. Vrushali Kinhalkar, Usha Parab, Sangita Barve, Pavan Nalat, Aishwarya Patekar, Aaba Patil, Shridhar Nandedkar and participants from all across the state participated in the poetry reading.

Vachan Prerana Din 
Celebrating the love of reading through ‘Vaachan Prerna Din’, organized a special meet and greet session for the students where they got a rare opportunity to meet with authors, poets, historians and language experts who interacted with them at various location across the village.

Genres 
Pustakanch Gaav has 19 libraries exclusive to 19 genres,each library is designed and decorated by freelance artists, painters and professional who believe in sending a strong social message through their artwork   ; shaped and beautified the surroundings of place with detailed murals, paintings and artworks that reflect the various themes of books, genres.

Map to all the 19 libraries :

Hagiography 
Hagiography is the body of literature that describes the lives, work and veneration of the saints. The literature of hagiography embraces the biographies of saintly monks, and accounts of miracles connected with saints’ tombs, relics, icons, or statues.

Maharashtra has a rich tradition of hagiography and this temple, where the air is potent with the chimes and the words of the saints. The steady stream of devotees pay their obeisance to the beautifully decorated gods that add to the divine atmosphere of this place. And one corner stands a cupboard that holds the divine words of our saints, waiting to be examined. It hosts the books of hagiography at Pustakanch Gaav, captures its core, bringing the words of the saints, alive for the readers to seek guidance from. The overall atmosphere of this temple allows the reader a chance to introspect and turn within for seeking answers to life's big questions.

Poetry 
In this cozy hall of the house at Pustakanch Gaav, the readers are given a rare opportunity to connect with works of Manik Sitaram Godghate (popularly known as Kavi Grace ), Shanta Shelke and many eminent poets that have enriched the Marathi literature with their works. Even in this highly commercialized world, the readers can rediscover the sensitivity hidden in the written word, through poetry.

Newspaper 
At Pustakanch Gaav, there is a home that host newspapers in the Marathi language, for the readers who are a fan of literature in hurry. This section hosts local and leading newspapers in the state made available for the delight of the readers. The open courtyard of the house and the streaming sunlight through the window provide a perfect setting for a day spent lazing in piles of newspapers, and endless cups of tea.

Location and Transportation

Location 
Spread over two kilometers, Bhilar is located at a distance of eight kilometers from Panchgani. It is situated just about 17 kilometers away from the sub-district headquarter Mahabaleshwar, which is a notable tourist spot in Maharashtra. Other major cities around Bhilar include Satara, Pune and Mumbai. Bhilar has an estimated population of 5,000 and is a major producing hub of strawberries. Pustakanch Gaav is accessible by road, rail and air transport.

Road 
There are various private buses, cabs and taxi services from Pune and Mumbai. Bhilar village is only 17 km from Mahabaleshwar.

Rail 
The nearest railway station is Satara which is 56 kilometers away from Bhilar. Nearest major railway junctions include Pune (148 km) and Miraj (188 km).

Air 
The nearest airport is Pune International Airport, which is about 118 km from Bhilar. Chhatrapati Shivaji International Airport of Mumbai is 259 km away.

References

External links
 Official website of Pustakanch Gaav

2017 establishments in Maharashtra
Libraries in Maharashtra
Libraries established in 2017